This is a list of episodes for Secret Millionaire. Secret Millionaire is a television series that aired on Fox for its first season and then on ABC for its remaining seasons. The show's first season ran from on December 3 to December 18, 2008 and the second season ran from March 3 to April 10, 2011. The third season ran from June 3, 2012 to September 8, 2013.

The series originated in the UK. The concept of the series involves millionaires going undercover in impoverished communities and agreeing to give away tens of thousands of dollars. Members of the community are informed that the cameras are present to film a documentary. The U.S. version was much like the British and featured each week wealthy benefactors entering deprived neighborhoods of the United States incognito. They spend a week mingling within the community and live on a very low-cost budget. At the end of the show, the millionaires reveal their identities and proceed to donate at least $100,000 to the members of the community.

Series overview

Episode list
"U.S. Viewers (in millions)" refers to the number of Americans who viewed the episode on the day of its original broadcast.

Season 1 (2008)

Season 2 (2011)

Season 3 (2012–2013)

See also
Moveable Feast (organization)

References

Secret Millionaire (American TV series)
Secret Millionaire (American TV series)